The 2014 French Open described in detail, in the form of day-by-day summaries.

Day 1 (25 May)
Schedule of play
 Seeds out:
 Women's Singles:  Kaia Kanepi [25]

Day 2 (26 May)
Stan Wawrinka became the first man who won Australian Open to lose in the opening round in Roland Garros since Petr Korda in 1998.
Schedule of play
 Seeds out:
 Men's Singles:  Stan Wawrinka [3],  Kei Nishikori [9],  Vasek Pospisil [30]
 Women's Singles:  Roberta Vinci [17]

Day 3 (27 May)
Li Na became the fourth woman who won Australian Open in the same year to lose in the opening round in Roland Garros. 

Schedule of play
 Seeds out:
 Men's Singles:  Grigor Dimitrov [11],  Tommy Haas [16],  Nicolás Almagro [21]
 Women's Singles:  Li Na [2],  Caroline Wozniacki [13],  Klára Koukalová [30]
 Men's Doubles:  Juan Sebastián Cabal /  Robert Farah [10]

Day 4 (28 May)
Schedule of play
 Seeds out:
 Men's Singles:  Mikhail Youzhny [15],  Alexandr Dolgopolov [20]
 Women's Singles:  Serena Williams [1],  Flavia Pennetta [12],  Sabine Lisicki [16],  Alizé Cornet [20],  Venus Williams [29],  Elena Vesnina [32]
 Men's Doubles:  Mariusz Fyrstenberg /  Marcin Matkowski [8]
 Women's Doubles:  Andrea Hlaváčková /  Lucie Šafářová [9],  Alla Kudryavtseva /  Anastasia Rodionova [10],  Vania King /  Zheng Jie [13]

Day 5 (29 May)
Schedule of play
 Seeds out:
 Men's Singles:  Feliciano López [26]
 Women's Singles:  Kirsten Flipkens [21],  Anastasia Pavlyuchenkova [24]
 Men's Doubles:  Rohan Bopanna /  Aisam-ul-Haq Qureshi [6]
 Women's Doubles:  Julia Görges /  Anna-Lena Grönefeld [8],  Anabel Medina Garrigues /  Yaroslava Shvedova [11]
 Mixed Doubles:  Květa Peschke /  Marcin Matkowski [4]

Day 6 (30 May)
Schedule of play
 Seeds out:
 Men's Singles:  Tommy Robredo [17],  Jerzy Janowicz [22],  Marin Čilić [25],  Roberto Bautista Agut [27],  Gilles Simon [29],  Dmitry Tursunov [31]
 Women's Singles:  Agnieszka Radwańska [3],  Dominika Cibulková [9],  Daniela Hantuchová [31]
 Men's Doubles:  Alexander Peya /  Bruno Soares [2],  David Marrero /  Fernando Verdasco [4],  Treat Huey /  Dominic Inglot [7],  Eric Butorac /  Raven Klaasen [14],  Pablo Cuevas /  Horacio Zeballos [16]
 Women's Doubles:  Klára Koukalová /  Monica Niculescu [14]
 Mixed Doubles:  Anabel Medina Garrigues /  David Marrero [7]

Day 7 (31 May)
Schedule of play
 Seeds out:
 Men's Singles:  Fabio Fognini [14],  Andreas Seppi [32]
 Women's Singles:  Petra Kvitová [5],  Ana Ivanovic [11],  Ekaterina Makarova [22],  Sorana Cîrstea [26]
 Men's Doubles:  Jean-Julien Rojer /  Horia Tecău [13],  Jamie Murray /  John Peers [15]
 Women's Doubles:  Ekaterina Makarova /  Elena Vesnina [3],  Raquel Kops-Jones /  Abigail Spears [6]
 Mixed Doubles:  Abigail Spears /  Alexander Peya [1]

Day 8 (1 June)
Schedule of play
 Seeds out:
 Men's Singles:  Roger Federer [4],  John Isner [10],  Richard Gasquet [12],  Jo-Wilfried Tsonga [13],  Philipp Kohlschreiber [28]
 Women's Singles:  Angelique Kerber [8],  Samantha Stosur [19]
 Men's Doubles:  Michaël Llodra /  Nicolas Mahut [5]
 Women's Doubles:  Liezel Huber /  Lisa Raymond [15]
 Mixed Doubles:  Katarina Srebotnik /  Rohan Bopanna [2],  Lucie Hradecká /  Mariusz Fyrstenberg [6]

Day 9 (2 June)
Schedule of play
 Seeds out:
 Men's Singles:  Kevin Anderson [19],  Fernando Verdasco [24]
 Women's Singles:  Jelena Janković [6],  Sloane Stephens [15],  Lucie Šafářová [23]
 Men's Doubles:  Bob Bryan /  Mike Bryan [1],  Daniel Nestor /  Nenad Zimonjić [3]
 Women's Doubles:  Flavia Pennetta /  Kristina Mladenovic [12]

Day 10 (3 June)
Schedule of play
 Seeds out:
 Men's Singles:  Tomáš Berdych [6],  Milos Raonic [8]
 Women's Singles:  Carla Suárez Navarro [14]
 Men's Doubles:  Łukasz Kubot /  Robert Lindstedt [9]
 Women's Doubles:  Cara Black /  Sania Mirza [5],  Ashleigh Barty /  Casey Dellacqua [7]
 Mixed Doubles:  Kristina Mladenovic /  Daniel Nestor [5]

Day 11 (4 June)
Schedule of play
 Seeds out:
 Men's Singles:  David Ferrer [5],  Gaël Monfils [23]
 Women's Singles:  Sara Errani [10],  Svetlana Kuznetsova [27]
 Women's Doubles:  Květa Peschke /  Katarina Srebotnik [4],  Marina Erakovic /  Arantxa Parra Santonja [16]
 Mixed Doubles:  Yaroslava Shvedova /  Bruno Soares [3]

Day 12 (5 June)
Schedule of play
 Seeds out:
 Women's Singles:  Eugenie Bouchard [18],  Andrea Petkovic [28]
 Mixed Doubles:  Julia Görges /  Nenad Zimonjić [8]

Day 13 (6 June)
Schedule of play
 Seeds out:
 Men's Singles:  Andy Murray [7],  Ernests Gulbis [18]

Day 14 (7 June) 
 Schedule of play
 Seeds out:
 Women's Singles:  Simona Halep [4]
 Men's Doubles:  Marcel Granollers /  Marc López [12]

Day 15 (8 June) 
 Schedule of play
 Seeds out:
 Men's Singles:  Novak Djokovic [2]
 Women's Doubles:  Sara Errani /  Roberta Vinci [2]

References

Day-by-day summaries
French Open by year – Day-by-day summaries